České slovo, also known as Svobodné slovo was a Czech daily newspaper, founded and continuously published in Prague since 1907, by Publishing House Melantrich, until its cancellation in 1997. The newspaper was founded by Union of National Social Workers of National Social Party led by Václav Klofáč and Jaroslav Šalda.
The newspaper was banned several times between 1915 and 1918, 1939 and 1945 and nationalised from 1948 to 1990. During the communist regime in Czechoslovakia, Josef Pejskar and Council of Free Czechoslovakia published a version for the Czechoslovak exile (1955–1990).

In 1990, the newspaper was renamed "Slovo" ("Word") and later was closed down due to bad privatisation of Melantrich in 1997.

One of its journalists was František R. Kraus.

See also
Melantrich
Czech National Social Party

References

 Libuše Pešková: Publikační činnost nakladatelství Melantrich od založení do vzniku 2. světové války (Publication activities of Melantrich until World War II), Charles University, 1975. A diploma work with complete bibliography from the 1918-38 period. (Czech)

Czech-language newspapers
Newspapers published in Prague
Daily newspapers published in the Czech Republic
Publications established in 1907
Czech National Social Party
Defunct newspapers published in the Czech Republic